NOS, SGPS S.A. is a Portuguese telecommunications and media company who provides mobile and fixed telephony, cable television, satellite television and internet. The company resulted from the merger in 2013 of two of the country's major telecommunications companies: Zon Multimédia (formerly known as PT Multimédia, a spun-off media arm of Portugal Telecom) and Sonae's Optimus Telecommunications.

NOS owns premium movie channels TVCine and has a 25% stake in the Sport TV television network. It also operates 4 channels in joint-venture with AMC Networks International Southern Europe. NOS Audiovisuais (formerly ZON Lusomundo) is a home-video and cinema film distributor and operates Nos Cinema, the largest cinema chain of Portugal.

History
NOS was founded as TVCabo in 1994, and was the third cable operator to be founded in Portugal (the first was the regional Cabo TV Madeirense, which was founded in 1992, followed by Bragatel early on in 1994). The first customer was connected in November 1994. Initially the channel offer consisted of thirty channels and the number of Portuguese-speaking channels was initially limited to the terrestrial channels, with the number of Portuguese-speaking channels increasing as the years went on.

The company might be considered a Portuguese dot-com. In the PT Multimédia days, it brought Portugal Telecom SAPO (a successful web portal and search engine, sold to its parent company in 2005), Lusomundo (a successful movie distributor, movie theater operator included in the spun off company and, formerly, the owner of the Diário de Notícias newspaper and the TSF radio, which were sold to Controlinveste the same year as SAPO was sold) and several TV channels such as SportTV, CNL (now SIC Notícias) and TVCine (MOV was only created after the spin-off).

On 17 January 2008, ZON announced it would acquire TVTEL, its main competitor in both cable and satellite broadcasting in Porto region. Thus, ZON was strengthening its position due to the appearance of a new significant rival, MEO from Portugal Telecom, using IPTV and satellite broadcasting systems, leaving only one other competing cable television and Internet operator in Portugal, Cabovisão.

On 29 September 2008, ZON Multimédia announced the new mobile product ZON Mobile (MVNO), the first real quad play operator in Portugal.

In November 2008, ZON announced that it would enter the contest for the fifth channel that would be created at the same time as Digital Terrestrial Television is introduced in Portugal.

On 17 March 2010, ZON renamed its cable and satellite television service as ZON TV, dropping the 16-year-old TV Cabo brand.

In 2013, a merger with Optimus (which also included Optimus Clix, Optimus Kanguru, Optimus Tag, Smart and WTF) was approved and the company was renamed to ZON Optimus. In May 2014, the two brands ZON and Optimus were merged into one single brand, called "NOS" (which is pronounced just like "nós", the Portuguese for “we”, “nodes” or “knots”).

See also
 Internet in Portugal

References

External links

Telecommunications companies established in 1994
Companies based in Lisbon
Television in Portugal
Internet service providers of Portugal
Mobile phone companies of Portugal
Cable television companies
VoIP companies
Portuguese brands
Portuguese companies established in 1994